This article presents the discography of Motown group The Temptations. They had 37 singles reach the Billboard Top 40 in the US, with four reaching #1. On the R&B singles chart, the group scored a record 71 Top 40 singles, with 14 reaching #1.

Albums

Studio albums

1964–1976: Gordy Records

1977–1978: Atlantic Records

1980–1986: Return to Gordy Records

1987–2004: Motown Records

2006–2007: New Door Records

2010–2022: 10/30 International and UME Direct

Live albums

Compilation albums

Soundtrack albums

Singles

As Otis Williams & The Siberians
 1958: "Pecos Kid" b/w "All of My Life"

As The Distants
 1959: "Come On" b/w "Always" (with The Andantes) 
 1960: "Open Your Heart" b/w "All Right"

1960s

1970s

1980s

1990s

Other charted songs

Notes

References

External links

Discography
Temptations
Rhythm and blues discographies